Temple Israel is a Reform Jewish synagogue in West Bloomfield, Michigan.

The congregation was founded in 1941 in Detroit. In 1949 the congregation erected an Art Deco temple designed by architect William Kapp.  It moved to West Bloomfield in 1980; the original temple is now the Word of Power Church and is included in the National Register of Historic Places as part of Detroit's  Palmer Park Apartment Building Historic District.

Temple Israel is among the largest Reform congregations in the country.  As of 2012 its website states that it is the largest in North America, and the official database of the Union for Reform Judaism confirms this, reporting a membership of 3,383.  In 1995, Temple Israel was the first reform congregation to open a mikveh (ritual bath).

The building was designed by Detroit architectural firm of Smith, Hinchman & Grylls who assigned William Kapp as chief architect.
In September 2016, Temple Israel officially announced a major renovation on the synagogue and display cases. It was completed in September 2017.

References

External links
Official website

Reform synagogues in Michigan
Art Deco synagogues
Art Deco architecture in Michigan
Jewish organizations established in 1941